Phil Brooks may refer to:

Sports
 Phil Brooks (American football) (born 1937), American football coach
 Phil Brooks (footballer) (1901–1963), Australian rules footballer
 Phil Brooks or CM Punk (born 1978), American professional wrestler and mixed martial artist

Others
 Philip C. Brooks (1906–1977), American archivist
 Philip John Brooks, British folk and rock musician

See also
 Phillips Brooks (1835–1893), Bishop of Massachusetts in the Episcopal Church during the early 1890s